The Mask (German: Die Maske) is a 1919 German silent crime film directed by Ewald André Dupont and starring Max Landa, Lil Dagover and Gertrude Welcker.

Cast
 Max Landa as Detektiv 
 Eduard von Winterstein as Graf Campobello 
 Gertrude Welcker as Delia Grace 
 Ernst Rückert as Oberleutnant Gregory 
 Fritz Schulz as Barneß, Gehilfe des Detektivs 
 Eva Speyer as Gräfin Campobello 
 Arthur Beder as Joe Franklin 
 Lil Dagover
 Wilhelm Diegelmann
 Emil Rameau

References

Bibliography
 Hans-Michael Bock and Tim Bergfelder. The Concise Cinegraph: An Encyclopedia of German Cinema. Berghahn Books, 2009.

External links

1919 films
Films of the Weimar Republic
German silent feature films
Films directed by E. A. Dupont
German crime films
1919 crime films
German black-and-white films
1910s German films
1910s German-language films